Springfield is an unincorporated community in Anderson County, in the U.S. state of Texas. According to the Handbook of Texas, the community had a population of 30 in 2000. It is located within the Palestine, Texas micropolitan area.

History
Springfield was established around 1875. The settlement consisted of a church, only one business, a factory, and several scattered homes along the road in the 1930s. In 1985, it had only one business, a church, and many houses, and became a crossroads community. It had an estimated population of 20 residents from 1939 to 1990 and gained 10 residents in 2000.

Geography

Education
Springfield had its own school in the 1930s which had 163 students enrolled in it in 1932. It then became part of the school in nearby Tennessee Colony in 1955. Today the community is served by the Cayuga Independent School District.

References

Unincorporated communities in Anderson County, Texas
Unincorporated communities in Texas